Raphitoma corbis is a species of sea snail, a marine gastropod mollusk in the family Raphitomidae.

Description
The length of the shell varies between 8 mm and 12 mm, its diameter between 3.4 mm and 4.5 mm.

Distribution
This marine species occurs in the Mediterranean Sea.

References

 Riccardo Giannuzzi Savelli Francesco Pusateri, Stefano Bartolini: A revision of the Mediterranean Raphitomidae (Gastropoda Conoidea), 6: on the Raphitoma corbis (Potiez et Michaud, 1838); Biodiversity Journal , 2018, 9 (3): 217–225

External links
  Potiez V. L. V. & Michaud A. L. G. (1838-1844). Galerie des Mollusques ou catalogue méthodique, descriptif et raisonné des Mollusques et Coquilles du Muséum de Douai. Paris, Baillière. Vol. 1: pp. 560 + XXXV
 Locard A. (1886). Prodrome de malacologie française. Catalogue général des mollusques vivants de France. Mollusque marins. Lyon, H. Georg & Paris, Baillière : pp. X + 778
 
 Gastropods.com: Raphitoma corbis

corbis
Gastropods described in 1838